WJJY-TV was a short-lived television station based in Jacksonville, Illinois that was on the air from 1969 to 1971.  It was the ABC television affiliate for Quincy, Illinois, and also reached Springfield as well.

History
West-central Illinois had limited choices for television in the 1960s.  Most of the western portion of the region was in the Quincy market, while most of the eastern portion was part of the Springfield/Decatur trading area of the Champaign/Urbana/Springfield market. A significant part of the Quincy market was in the states of Missouri and Iowa.  For much of the region, television was limited to WGEM-TV and KHQA-TV in Quincy, or grade B signals from the St. Louis VHF stations.  A few homes in the area (mostly in the eastern part of the region) could watch UHF stations from Springfield, and with luck could pick up signals from Peoria.

Keith Moyer, an out-of-town promoter who also started WTIM radio in Taylorville, believed that Quincy was big enough to support a third station.  With the help of several Jacksonville-area investors, he formed Look Television Corporation and applied for the channel 14 license.  Jacksonville was chosen because it was the nearest city to Quincy with an available commercial license, even though it was located on the Springfield/Decatur side of the Champaign/Urbana/Springfield market.  On August 18, 1969, WJJY-TV started broadcasting as an ABC affiliate.

WJJY had a lot going for it on paper.  It signed-on using every watt of its legally permitted 4.5 million watts of effective radiated power — at the time, the most powerful UHF station in the world.  It operated from a 1,610-foot tower near Bluffs, Illinois, one of the three tallest structures in North America at the time.  It was topped with an experimental RCA "Vee-Zee" antenna, one of only three ever constructed.  Since the station aired on the lowest portion of the UHF dial, the antenna weighed 26 tons—one of the heaviest ever put into service.  On its first day on the air, reception reports came in from as far south as Cape Girardeau, Missouri and as far north as Minneapolis.

Look Television persuaded ABC to give the station the exclusive affiliation for the Quincy market. Previously, ABC had been relegated to off-hours clearances on NBC affiliate WGEM-TV and CBS affiliate KHQA (licensed to Hannibal, Missouri, but with studios in Quincy).  The transmitter's location and power gave the station primary coverage of Springfield as well even though there was already an ABC affiliate in the area, WAND in Decatur.  The station usually identified as "Jacksonville/Springfield/Quincy" on-air, even though Quincy was its primary market.  WJJY agreed to air the entire ABC schedule in pattern with no pre-emptions (except for breaking local news).  The microwave relay system was built to be redundant in order to ensure that the ABC feed would always be available.

The station was on the air from 9am to midnight every day.  Programming consisted of movies, travelogues and St. Louis Cardinals baseball, in addition to ABC programs.  It also aired local newscasts each night at 6pm and 10pm. Starting in 1970, it aired some PBS programming as well as educational programs from the Illinois Office of Superintendent of Public Instruction via microwave relay from WILL-TV in Champaign-Urbana during off-ABC hours.  The area had been one of the few areas in the country without access to public television.

However, WJJY struggled almost from the start.  For one thing, most of its viewers in the Quincy market, a previously all-VHF area, had probably not bought new sets since the Federal Communications Commission required television sets to include UHF tuning capability in 1964.  In addition, most Quincy-area viewers could watch ABC on two longer-established VHF stations: KTVI in St. Louis (now a Fox affiliate) and KTVO in Kirksville, Missouri (which became a primary ABC affiliate in 1968).  KTVI's grade B signal covers much of the Missouri and Illinois portions of the market, while KTVO's grade B signal covers nearly all of the market.  As a result, the station made almost no headway against WGEM and KHQA.  It was nonexistent in Springfield as well, gaining no ground against established stations WAND, WICS and WCIA.  Look Television had expected WJJY to be profitable almost immediately — an unrealistic goal for any station, especially one serving what then as now was a very small market.

The next year and a half witnessed a litany of bounced paychecks and unpaid bills.  The biggest problems, ironically, came from what was potentially WJJY's most important asset, the transmitter.  Look Television was badly undercapitalized, and its owners did not anticipate the high electrical costs from running such a powerful transmitter.  The Western Illinois Power Cooperative shut off power to the transmitter on several occasions due to nonpayment, though WIPCO always restored the power each time to avoid responsibility for a 1,600-foot unlighted airplane hazard.

By early 1971, ABC was giving serious thought to yanking its affiliation from WJJY.  The network's ratings in Quincy were lower than they were when it aired part-time on KHQA and WGEM.  Many of the station's engineering staff had left the station in 1970 after going unpaid.  Finally that spring, Look Television was placed into receivership, and WJJY signed off for the last time September 15, 1971, with almost no fanfare after an episode of The Dick Cavett Show.  Quincy would not get another full-time ABC affiliate until 2007, when KHQA set up an ABC affiliate on its digital subchannel.

Look Television eventually agreed in principle to sell the tower to Convocom, a consortium of west-central Illinois educational institutions.  Convocom planned to use the tower for WJPT, a PBS member station serving Springfield and Quincy.  However, on March 26, 1978—while financing was still being put together—a severe ice storm coated the tower with thick sheets of ice. With the shifting weight of the antenna, the tower collapsed.  It had been designed with the specifications of a lighter antenna, and was thus not properly engineered to sustain the extra weight.  The same ice storm brought down WAND's tower, which was designed similarly to WJJY's tower.

References

 Convocom: Bringing People Together through Telecommunication, 1979 ; Lee C. Frischknecht Papers, University of Maryland Archives; series 4, box 18, folder 3

 

Television channels and stations established in 1969
Television channels and stations disestablished in 1971
Defunct television stations in the United States
Jacksonville, Illinois micropolitan area 
Companies based in Morgan County, Illinois
Television stations in Illinois
Defunct companies based in Illinois
1969 establishments in Illinois
1971 disestablishments in Illinois
JJY-TV